This is a list of candidates for the 1973 New South Wales state election. The election was held on 17 November 1973.

Retiring Members
Note: Jack Beale MLA (Liberal, South Coast) resigned some months prior to the election. No by-election was held.

Labor
 Reg Coady MLA (Drummoyne)
 Clarrie Earl MLA (Bass Hill)
 Joe Kelly MLA (East Hills)
 Norm Ryan MLA (Marrickville)
 Bill Sheahan MLA (Burrinjuck)
 Albert Sloss MLA (King)
 Jim Southee MLA (Mount Druitt)

Liberal
 Sir Kevin Ellis MLA (Coogee)
 Harry Jago MLA (Gordon)

Independent
 Bill Chaffey MLA (Tamworth) – elected as Country

Legislative Assembly
Sitting members are shown in bold text. Successful candidates are highlighted in the relevant colour. Where there is possible confusion, an asterisk (*) is also used.

See also
 Members of the New South Wales Legislative Assembly, 1973–1976
 Members of the New South Wales Legislative Council, 1973–1976

References
 

1973